Jim Smoak (born July 7, 1934) is an American bluegrass and country music banjo player from Louisiana. Smoak may be the first bluegrass banjoist to have come from that state.

Smoak was born and raised on a farm in Round O, South Carolina and learned banjo playing from his parents. He performed on WROL radio when he was eighteen years old. Smoak had a difficult time establishing an audience in his home state, so he moved north in the 1950s. Through 1953, he played occasionally with Bill Monroe & His Bluegrass Boys; the following year, he became a permanent member of the band. Smoak joined Hylo Brown & the Timberliners in 1958, and later began to perform with Arthur Smith and the Cracker Jacks on radio stations WAFB in Baton Rouge, Louisiana and WBT in Charlotte, North Carolina. He went solo in 1961 recording for the tiny Folk Lyric label. Smoak played both bluegrass and country music in the 1960s, and in the 1970s, he published three praised banjo instruction books, some of the first to include standard musical notation and tablature. Smoak recorded Moonshine Sonata, a solo album with Blue River Records, in 1979.

Notes

References
Chadbourne, Eugene. "Jim Smoak." Allmusic. Accessed 2 November 2006.

American country banjoists
American bluegrass musicians
1934 births
Living people
Country musicians from Louisiana